Hibbertia fumana is a species of flowering plant in the family Dilleniaceae and is endemic to New South Wales. It is a low-lying to prostrate shrublet with narrow oblong leaves and yellow flowers with five to seven stamens arranged in a single cluster on one side of two hairy carpels. When first formally described in 2012 it was thought to be extinct, but small populations have since been found in the Sydney region.

Description
There are five to seven stamens in a single cluster on one side of the two hairy carpels.

Taxonomy
Hibbertia fumana was first formally described in 2012 by Hellmut R. Toelken in the Journal of the Adelaide Botanic Gardens from specimens collected before 1824 by Franz Sieber, George Caley and  Robert Brown "near Sydney", in Western Sydney and "near South Head". The specific epithet (fumana) was used on the labels on the specimens collected by Sieber, and refers to the similarity of the hairy, linear leaves to those of plants in the genus Fumana.

Distribution and habitat
When first formally described in 2012, H. fumana was considered to be extinct but was rediscovered in October 2016 in Moorebank and subsequently found in a range extending from Richmond to Mittagong. It grows in a range of habitats including open areas, disturbed sites and with sedges, rushes and grasses.<ref name="OEH">{{cite web |title=""hibbertia fumana |url=https://www.environment.nsw.gov.au/threatenedspeciesapp/profile.aspx?id=20323 |publisher=New South Wales Government Office of Environment and Heritage |access-date=13 June 2021}}</ref>

Conservation status
This hibbertia is listed as "critically endangered" under the New South Wales Government Biodiversity Conservation Act 2016''. The main threats to the species include inappropriate fire regimes, weed invasion and the species' small population size.

References

fumana
Flora of New South Wales
Plants described in 2012
Taxa named by Hellmut R. Toelken